The Women's 1500 metre freestyle competition of the 2022 European Aquatics Championships was held on 14 and 15 August 2022.

Records
Before the competition, the existing world, European and championship records were as follows.

Results

Heats
The heats were started on 14 August at 10:18.

Final
The final was held on 15 August at 19:29.

References

Women's 1500 metre freestyle